In telecommunication, a medium-power talker is a hypothetical talker, within a log-normal distribution of talkers, whose volume lies at the medium power of all talkers determining the volume distribution at the point of interest.  

When the distribution follows a log-normal curve (values expressed in decibels), the mean and standard deviation can be used to compute the medium-power talker. The talker volume distribution follows a log-normal curve and the medium-power talker is uniquely determined by the average talker volume. The medium-power talker volume, V, is given by V = V o + 0.115σ2, where V o is the average of the talker volume distribution in volume units (vu), and σ2 is the variance of the distribution.

Telecommunication theory
Telephony